Boban Kajgo (born March 10, 1989 in Mostar) is a Canadian soccer player of Serbian origin who plays for the OFK Balkan Mirijevo in the Serbian League Belgrade.

Career

Youth
Kajgo began his career with ASJ Jean Talon and attended 2003 into the Concordia University. He played than from 2005 to 2007 in the youth side for OFK Belgrade.

Professional
In 2007 signed his first professional contract with FK Hajduk Beograd and earned in two years 37 games, who scores 5 goals. He left his club FK Hajduk Beograd to join on 14 July 2009 in the Serbian SuperLiga club FK Smederevo, signing a two-year contract.

In summer 2011 he joined FK Leotar in the Premier League of Bosnia and Herzegovina, but during the following winter break he moved to FK Sutjeska Foča playing in the First League of the Republika Srpska. During the summer of 2012, Kajgo returned to Belgrade and joined Balkan Mirijevo – a member of third tier of Serbian football.

International career
He earned 8 games and scored 4 goals for the Quebec national trainings centre in 2004 and played for the team in 2007 at Coupe Du Québec Saputo AAA.

References

External sources
 Boban Kajgo at Srbijafudbal

1989 births
Living people
Sportspeople from Mostar
Serbs of Bosnia and Herzegovina
Canadian soccer players
Canadian expatriate soccer players
Naturalized citizens of Canada
Canadian people of Serbian descent
Serbian footballers
Serbian emigrants to Canada
Association football midfielders
FK Hajduk Beograd players
FK Smederevo players
FK Leotar players
FK Balkan Mirijevo players